Nizamabad district is located in the Indian state of Telangana. The district has 922 villages which are administered in 36 mandals.

Mandal wise villages

The following are the list of villages in their respective mandals as per 2011 census of India.

Source:
Census India 2011 (sub districts)
Nizamabad district and Sub-district (Mandals)

A

B 
36 ||  ||   ||   ||   ||    ||     ||   Bhulakshmi camp

D 
21             ansanpally yanampally

G

J

K

L

M

N

P

R

S

T

V

Y

References

Villages
Villages
Nizamabad villages
Nizamabad
Nizamabad district